An Elephant in my Kitchen, published in July 2018 by Pan Macmillan in London, is the first book written by South African author and conservationist Françoise Malby-Anthony along with author Katja Willemsen.

The story is told out of the eyes of Françoise Malby-Anthony who continued to manage Thula Thula Private Game Reserve in KwaZulu Natal South Africa after Lawrence Anthony's death in 2012, and is considered the sequel of The Elephant Whisperer, published by Lawrence Anthony in 2009.

The book was the number one bestseller in South Africa for a number of weeks in 2018, and has been launched in the UK, Australia, New Zealand and India. The book launched in Canada and the United States in November 2018.

References

External links
 Books Web Page
 Books Web Page in German
 Books Web Page in French

2018 non-fiction books
South African non-fiction books
Sequel books
Elephant conservation
Books about elephants
Pan Books books